The 1970 CONCACAF Youth Tournament was held in Cuba.

Teams
The following teams entered the tournament:

Matches

External links
Results by RSSSF

CONCACAF Under-20 Championship
1970 in youth association football
September 1970 sports events in North America
October 1970 sports events in North America
1970 in Cuban sport